Swarupadas (1801–1863) was a Rajasthani poet of the medieval era. He was from the Charan family of the Indian state Rajasthan.

He was follower of Dadu Dayal. His childhood name was Shankardan. His parents were from Umarkot (now in Pakistan). His father Misridan migrated to village Badli in Ajmer. He has been instructed by his uncle Premanad in poetry. He had worked in the courts of Ratlam, Sitamau, Sailana etc.

Works

His works include philosophy, faith, ethics, self-realisation etc. His composed poems are:

"Pandava Yashendu Chandrika"
"Rasa Ratnakar"
"Varnartha Manjari"
"Vritti Bodh"
"Hrinayananjan"
"Tarka Prabandha"
"Drishtanta Dipika"
"Sadharanopadesha"
"Sukshimopadesha"
"Aviek Paddhati"
"Pakhand Kandan"
"Chijjada Bodhpatrika"

References 

Indian male poets
Rajasthani-language writers
1801 births
1863 deaths
People from Ajmer district
19th-century Indian poets
Poets from Rajasthan
19th-century Indian male writers
Charan